Angel of Darkness or variations thereof may refer to:

 Fallen angels of Abrahamic religions

Film and TV
 Angels of Darkness, a 1954 film
 , a 1994 hentai anime series
 The Alienist: Angel of Darkness, the second season of The Alienist, based on the 1997 book

Books
Angel of Darkness, 1990 novel by Samuel M. Key
 Angel of Darkness (book), a 1991 true crime book by Dennis McDougal
 The Angel of Darkness, a 1997 crime novel by Caleb Carr

Music
 "Angel of Darkness" (song), a 2003 song by Alex Christensen
"Angel of Darkness", a 2011 song by Andy James

Other
 Tomb Raider: The Angel of Darkness, a 2003 video game

See also
 Angels of Darkness, Demons of Light I, a 2011 album by Earth
 Angels of Darkness, Demons of Light II, a 2012 album by Earth
 Fallen angel (disambiguation)
 Evil Angel (disambiguation)
 Dark Angel (disambiguation)
 Darkness (disambiguation)
 Angel (disambiguation)